Heinz Vinke (22 May 1920 – 26 February 1944) was a German Luftwaffe military aviator during World War II, a night fighter ace credited with 54 aerial victories claimed in approximately 150 combat missions making him the eighteenth most successful night fighter pilot in the history of aerial warfare. All of his victories were claimed over the Western Front in Defense of the Reich missions against the Royal Air Force's (RAF) Bomber Command.

Born in Barby, Vinke grew up in the Weimar Republic and Nazi Germany. Following graduation from school and the compulsory Reichsarbeitsdienst (Reich Labour Service), he joined the military service in 1938. Vinke then served with Nachtjagdgeschwader 1 (NJG 1—1st Night Fighter Wing), flying a Messerschmitt Bf 110 heavy fighter. Following an injury sustained in July 1941, he was posted to Nachtjagdgeschwader 2 (NJG 2—2nd Night Fighter Wing) where he claimed his first aerial victory on the night of 27/28 February 1942. Following his 25th aerial victory, he was awarded the Knight's Cross of the Iron Cross on 19 September 1943. Vinke and his crew were shot down and killed in action on 26 February 1944, while on a search and rescue mission over the English Channel. He was posthumously bestowed with the Knight's Cross of the Iron Cross with Oak Leaves.

Early life and career
Vinke was born on 22 May 1920 in Barby, in the Province of Saxony, a Free State of Prussia. He was the son of merchant Heinrich Vinke and his wife Martha, née Rehse. Until 1935, he attended school in Barby. While at school, he joined the Flying Hitler Youth (Flieger-HJ) and became a glider pilot, receiving his A, B and C license to fly glider aircraft. Following six months of compulsory National Labour Service, he joined the Luftwaffe on 1 April 1938.

World War II
World War II in Europe began on Friday, 1 September 1939, when German forces invaded Poland. At the time, Vinke was based at Stargard on the Fliegerhorst Klützow, present-day Kluczewo Airfield, where he received his flight training which he completed in 1940. At Stargard, he met his future wife Erika Schröder and they were married on 20 April 1942 in Berlin-Kreuzberg.

At first, he was trained as a Zerstörer (destroyer) pilot. Holding the rank of Unteroffizier, he was posted to the 4. Staffel (4th squadron) of Nachtjagdgeschwader 1 (NJG 1—1st Night Fighter Wing) in early 1941. On 25 July 1941, Vinke and his radio operator Gerhard Schlein flew Messerschmitt Bf 110 C (Werknummer 2075—factory number) over the North Sea in the vicinity of Texel when they suffered engine problems. Vinke instructed his radio operator to bail out, the parachute failed to open and Schlein fell to his death. Vinke made a forced landing in a corn field near De Cocksdorp, Texel, injuring his back. Vinke was first treated at a hospital in Den Burg and later at Heiloo. Following seven months of convalescence, he was assigned to 5. Staffel (5th squadron) of Nachtjagdgeschwader 2 (NJG 2—2nd Night Fighter Wing), this unit was later redesignated to 11./NJG 1.

Night fighter career

Following the 1939 aerial Battle of the Heligoland Bight, Royal Air Force (RAF) attacks shifted to the cover of darkness, initiating the Defence of the Reich campaign. By mid-1940, Generalmajor (Brigadier General) Josef Kammhuber had established a night air defense system dubbed the Kammhuber Line. It consisted of a series of control sectors equipped with radars and searchlights and an associated night fighter. Each sector named a Himmelbett (canopy bed) would direct the night fighter into visual range with target bombers. In 1941, the Luftwaffe started equipping night fighters with airborne radar such as the Lichtenstein radar. This airborne radar did not come into general use until early 1942.

The aircraft was the RAF Whitley Z9280 from No. 77 Squadron which crashed at 22:58 at Driesum. Four members of the crew, including Squadron Leader Leslie Hugh William Parkin (DFC), were killed in action and one man was taken prisoner of war. For this victory, he received the Iron Cross 2nd Class that day.

His next claim was filed on the night of 3/4 June 1942 when he shot down a Short Stirling at 02:16 over the Zuiderzee. The same month, on 25/26 June at 00:42 again over the Zuiderzee, he claimed a Handley Page Halifax shot down. Flying Officer John Whittingham and another crew member died, and three others were taken prisoner. His fourth victory was over a Vickers Wellington shot down into the IJsselmeer on 28 June 1942 at 00:54 east of Enkhuizen. Flying Officer Derek Osborne and his crew of four were lost. Credited with four victories, Vinke was awarded the Iron Cross 1st Class on 1 July 1942. He became an ace when he shot down his fifth opponent, a Vickers Wellington bomber, on the night of 27/28 August 1942 at 02:32. On 9 October, while under the influence of alcohol, Vinke was involved in a small arms accident which resulted in the injury of another soldier. He, and two other involved soldiers, were taken to the Luftwaffe headquarters in Amsterdam. A court-martial sentenced him to five days of confinement. On 9 January 1943, Vinke was again put under arrest and grounded following an unauthorized nosedive over the Leeuwarden Air Base resulting in significant damage to a parked Bf 110 F-4. On 29 March 1943, Vinke was awarded the Honor Goblet of the Luftwaffe and the Front Flying Clasp of the Luftwaffe for Night Fighters.

Vinke flew regularly during the Battle of the Ruhr. One of two claims on the 9 April 1943 was Lancaster ED554 "EM-Q", from No. 207 Squadron RAF. The action caused the death of Sergeant Harold Healy RCAF and his crew. The seven men are buried in Amsterdam's New Eastern Cemetery. On the night of the 13/14 May 1943 he claimed a 23rd victory over the Netherlands. It may have been Wellington MS473; or misidentified and actually Lancaster ED589 "WS-P" from No. 9 Squadron RAF. Sergeant George Saxton and his crew were killed.

On 17/18 August 1943, RAF Bomber Command targeted Peenemünde and the V-weapons test centre. Five Bristol Beaufighter night fighters of No. 141 Squadron, under the command of Wing Commander Bob Braham, intercepted five Messerschmitt Bf 110s from IV. Gruppe (4th group) of NJG 1, and Feldwebel (Sergeant) Georg Kraft (14 victories) and Feldwebel Vinke (at the time with 20 claims) were both shot down by Braham near Schiermonnikoog. Vinke was the only one of his crew to survive. Vinke observed the demise of Kraft and attempted to attack the Beaufighter in the same way, from below and to starboard. The British airmen managed to obtain a visual contact on Vinke in time, and out-turned him. The control column was shot out from his hand and the British caused fatal damage to the Bf 110 from short range, just missing a collision. Following the death of his former crew Feldwebel Karl Schödel and Unteroffizier Johann Gaa, Vinke teamed up with Unteroffizier Rudolf Dunger.

Vinke was decorated with the Knight's Cross of the Iron Cross on 19 September 1943, the nomination had been submitted for 25 aerial victories claimed earlier. The presentation was made by Generalmajor Joachim-Friedrich Huth. Just four days later, Vinke shot down Lancaster DV201 for his 29th victory.

Vinke continued to claim through October. The bomber was on a mine-laying operation; the pilot Flight Sergeant Thomas Robertson Ewen of the Royal Air Force Volunteer Reserve and his crew died on their only war mission. Vinke made the Stirling claim in the same area and time. On 8/9 October, one source identifies his 33rd aerial victory as possibly Lancaster JB181 from No. 7 Squadron RAF. Flying Officer Bruce Macpherson and his crew were all killed; the eldest was 22, the youngest, air gunner Sergeant Eric Brinton, 17 years old. On 20 October, Vinke downed a Lancaster JB154 of the Pathfinders No. 83 Squadron returning from a Leipzig mission at 21:35 near Anreep, Netherlands. Squadron Leader R.J. Manton (pilot) and all his crew were killed.

On 19/20 February 1944, Vinke claimed three aerial victories, two Lancasters and one Halifax bomber. His first claim of the night, a Lancaster, occurred at 01:46 in sector "BM-77", the second Lancaster was claimed at 01:57 in sector "BM-78", while the Halifax was claimed to be shot down at 02:13 in sector "CX-62". Vinke also claimed two other victories that day, earning him the title of "ace-in-a-day".

Oberfeldwebel (Master Sergeant) Vinke was shot down and killed while flying Messerschmitt Bf 110 G-4 (Werknummer 740136) of 11./NJG 1 on 26 February 1944, while on a search and rescue mission over the English Channel. The victors were two Hawker Typhoons of No. 198 Squadron RAF, flown by F/L. (later Colonel) Raymond "Cheval" Lallamont DFC and F/O. George Hardy. His crew of Unteroffizier Rudolf Dunger and Unteroffizier Rudolf Walter were also killed. Their bodies were never recovered.  On 25 April 1944, he was posthumously awarded the Knight's Cross of the Iron Cross with Oak Leaves, the 465th officer or soldier of the Wehrmacht so honored. Vinke was credited with 54 aerial victories, all of them at night, claimed in approximately 150 combat missions operations.

Summary of career

Aerial victory claims
Foreman, Parry and Mathews, authors of Luftwaffe Night Fighter Claims 1939 – 1945, researched the German Federal Archives and found records for 53 nocturnal victory claims Mathews and Foreman also published Luftwaffe Aces — Biographies and Victory Claims, listing Vinke with 51 claims.

Awards
 Iron Cross (1939)
 2nd Class (27 February 1942)
 1st Class (1 July 1942)
 Front Flying Clasp of the Luftwaffe in Gold
 for Night Fighter (29 March 1943)
 in Gold (2 February 1944)
 Honour Goblet of the Luftwaffe on 29 March 1943 as Feldwebel and pilot
 German Cross in Gold on 2 August 1943 as Feldwebel in the 5./Nachtjagdgeschwader 2
 Knight's Cross of the Iron Cross with Oak Leaves
 Knight's Cross on 19 September 1943 as Feldwebel and pilot in the 11./Nachtjagdgeschwader 1
 465th Oak Leaves on 25 April 1944 as Oberfeldwebel and pilot in the 11./Nachtjagdgeschwader 1

Promotions

Notes

References

Citations

Bibliography

 
 
 
 
 
 
 
 
 
 
 
 
 
 
 
 
 
 

1920 births
1944 deaths
People from Barby, Germany
People from the Province of Saxony
Luftwaffe pilots
German World War II flying aces
Luftwaffe personnel killed in World War II
Recipients of the Gold German Cross
Recipients of the Knight's Cross of the Iron Cross with Oak Leaves
Aviators killed by being shot down
Reich Labour Service members
Hitler Youth members
Military personnel from Saxony-Anhalt